Pete Parkkonen may refer to:

Pete Parkkonen (drummer), Finnish drummer of band Zen Café
Pete Parkkonen (singer) (born 1990), Finnish singer and contestant in Finnish Idols